Bazarragchaagiin Jamsran (born 12 December 1950) is a Mongolian former wrestler who competed in the 1972 Summer Olympics.

References

External links
 

1950 births
Living people
Olympic wrestlers of Mongolia
Wrestlers at the 1972 Summer Olympics
Mongolian male sport wrestlers
20th-century Mongolian people
21st-century Mongolian people